Ali Ashkani Aghbolagh (born November 16, 1978) is a retired amateur Iranian Greco-Roman wrestler and currently coach of Iranian Greco-Roman wrestling, who competed in the men's lightweight category. He won four Asian Championship medals (three golds and one silver), picked up a silver in the 60-kg division at the 2005 World Wrestling Championships in Budapest, Hungary, and represented Iran in two editions of the Olympic Games (2000 and 2004), finishing fifth in Sydney and eleventh in Athens respectively. Throughout his sporting career, Ashkani trained full-time for Takhti Wrestling Club in Ardabil under his coach and mentor jafar Damirchi.

Ashkani reached sporting headlines at the 2000 Asian Wrestling Championships in Seoul, South Korea, where he won his first title in the 58-kg division over Uzbekistan's Dilshod Aripov. A few months later, Ashkani entered the 2000 Summer Olympics in Sydney as a dark horse in the men's featherweight category (58 kg). He dominated the field by thrashing Hungary's István Majoros (1–5) and Georgia's Koba Guliashvili in the prelim pool to secure his place in the next round of the tournament. Ashkani lost the quarterfinal match to eventual silver medalist Kim In-Sub of South Korea with a powerful 3–1 decision, but bounced back to turn down U.S. wrestler Jim Gruenwald on the mat 3–2 for a fifth-place finish.

After his first Olympics, Ashkani proved particularly successful in his career with two more medals in both 58 and 60-kg division at the Asian Championships (2001 and 2003). Determined to return to the wrestling scene and medal, Ashkani emerged himself as a top medal favorite at the 2002 Asian Games in South Korea, but lost to Kazakhstan's Nurlan Koizhaiganov in the quarterfinal match 4–1.

At the 2004 Summer Olympics in Athens, Ashkani qualified for his second Iranian squad, as a 25-year-old, in the men's 60 kg class. Earlier in the process, he finished third at the Olympic Qualification Tournament in Tashkent, Uzbekistan to guarantee his spot on the Iranian wrestling team. Ashkani lost two opening matches each to Cuba's Roberto Monzón (1–4) and Turkey's Şeref Tüfenk (1–3), but stunned the home crowd to tame Greek wrestler Christos Gikas with a 1–6 verdict at the end of the prelim pool. Unlike his previous Games, Ashkani's performance was not enough to advance him to the quarterfinals, placing eleventh in the final standings.

In 2005, Ashkani recovered from an Olympic setback to flourish his wrestling career with two more medals. He reaped the men's 60-kg title over South Korea's Kim Keum-Hae at the Summer Universiade in Izmir, Turkey, and then picked up a silver medal from the World Championships in Budapest, Hungary, losing out to defending titleholder Armen Nazaryan of Bulgaria due to a three-caution violation by the referee.

References

External links
Profile – International Wrestling Database

1978 births
People from Ardabil
Living people
Olympic wrestlers of Iran
Wrestlers at the 2000 Summer Olympics
Iranian male sport wrestlers
Wrestlers at the 2004 Summer Olympics
Wrestlers at the 1998 Asian Games
Wrestlers at the 2002 Asian Games
Wrestlers at the 2006 Asian Games
World Wrestling Championships medalists
Universiade medalists in wrestling
Universiade gold medalists for Iran
Asian Games competitors for Iran
Medalists at the 2005 Summer Universiade